Sweetwater is the debut studio album by the Los Angeles band, Sweetwater. The album is musically enriched by several influences from different genres that the band sought to experiment with. Much of the band's resemblance came from Jefferson Airplane, the group that successfully integrated jazz fusion into their compositions. Upon the album's release, it was largely unnoticed, but still became the band's only work to chart in the Billboard 200. Their most acclaimed track is the opening cover version of "Motherless Child".

Background

Sweetwater was composed of eight individuals of different ethnicities, all of whom had common beginnings on the coffeehouse circuit in Los Angeles. With psychedelic music at the height of its popularity in 1968, Reprise Records decided to sign the band to their label to capitalize on it. The band was not just limited to the psychedelic scene though, as Sweetwater immersed itself in multiple musical genres ranging from folk rock, latin rock, and classical music. Reprise knowingly produced for the band, despite the fact their sound was not marketable to the general public.

Recording commenced at the Sound Factory in Hollywood, California with producer Dave Hassinger, notable for producing other musical groups like The Electric Prunes. The tracks included original material along with covers of traditional pieces. The band was highly versatile as it possessed musicians who played a wide variety of exotic instruments including congas, percussion, and bongos. The congas, in particular, were peculiar to the group at the time as other bands, most notably Santana, had not yet come to prominence with their incorporation of the instrument in rock music. Another interesting aspect regarding recordings, was the total lack of electric guitar, an instrument Sweetwater disregarded the use of, even in live performances. Arrangements of the instrumentals were conducted by Alex del Zoppo and Frank Herrera, and, in all aspects, the two utlilized the capabilities of their bandmates as they were involved in the process of each track. For that reason, there was complexity in all aspects of their compositions, from the hallucinogenic tunes such as "My Crystal Spider", and more traditional arrangements like their rendition of the Negro spiritual, "Motherless Child". Nansi Nevins was the lead vocalist on all tracks; however, Sweetwater is the only album that the singer was involved in throughout the whole process. This was a consequence of an automobile accident in which Nevins suffered severe injuries to her brain and vocal cords.

Sweetwater was released in 1968 with the catalog number RS #6313, just getting into the national charts at number 200 where it would stay for two weeks. With the album, two singles, "Motherless Child b/w "Why Oh Why and "My Crystal Spider" b/w "What's Wrong" preceded it, both of which failed to chart. Still, "Motherless Child" became popular in Los Angeles when it was constantly played on FM radio. The band's take on the traditional blues song became a favorite associated with group. The cover features the group in their usual live attire, and their primary instruments in hand. Despite the limited success of their debut effort, Sweetwater, in 1969, would partake in the proceedings at the Woodstock Festival, and became remembered as the first band to perform.

Track listing
 "Motherless Child" - 5:04
 "Here We Go Again" - 2:32
 "For Pete's Sake" - 2:50
 "Come Take a Walk" - 3:48
 "What's Wrong" - 4:00
 "In a Rainbow" - 3:17 
 "My Crystal Spider" - 3:52
 "Rondeau" - 1:15
 "Two Worlds" - 3:56
 "Through an Old Storybook" - 2:32
 "Why Oh Why" - 3:00

Personnel
 Nansi Nevins - lead vocals
 Frank Herrera - bass guitar, backing vocals
 August Burns - cello
 Elpidio Cobian - congas, percussion
 Alan Malarowitz - drums
 Albert Moore - flute, backing vocals
 R.G. Carlyle - acoustic guitar, bongos, backing vocals
 Alex Del Zoppo - keyboards, backing vocals

References

1968 debut albums
Albums produced by David Hassinger
Reprise Records albums
Sweetwater (band) albums